A list of masters of St John's College, Cambridge.

Dates for masters up to 13 Dec 1952 are taken from

Many of the later dates are taken from the college magazine, The Eagle

References

 
St John's College, Cambridge
St John's